Elections to the North West Leicestershire District Council took place on 5 May 2011, in line with other local elections in the United Kingdom. A total of 38 councillors were elected from 20 wards as the whole council is up for election.

The Conservatives held control of the council after winning it in a landslide at the previous election. The Labour Party failed to retake control of the council but made significant gains at the expense of the Conservatives, who lost 6 councillors, the Liberal Democrats, who lost 2 councillors, the BNP, who lost both of their councillors, and one Independent.

Results

|}

Ward results
In wards that are represented by more than one councillor, electors were given more than one vote each, hence the voter turnout may not match the number of votes cast.

Appleby

Ashby Castle

Ashby Holywell

Ashby Ivanhoe

Bardon

Breedon

Castle Donington

Coalville

Greenhill

Hugglescote

Ibstock and Heather

Kegworth and Whatton

Measham

Moira

Oakthorpe and Donisthorpe

Ravenstone and Packington

Snibston

Thringstone

Valley

Whitwick

References

2011
2011 English local elections
2010s in Leicestershire